The Overgangsklasse is the fourth highest domestic cricket competition in the Netherlands. There are two pools, Overgangsklasse A (OVA) and Overgangsklasse B (OVB) playing in the regular competition. This overgangs level can be loosely translated as 'transition' between the comparatively less competitive lower leagues (Tweede Klasse, Derde Klasse, etc) and the more professional higher leagues (Eerste Klasse, Hoofdklasse and Topklasse). All leagues higher than Overgangsklasse are conducted at a national level.

Competition Structure
Each of the two pools, OVA and OVB, have 8 teams each which play a round robin home and away league. The matches are played with each inning limited to 40 overs. The champions in each of the pools get promoted to the Eerste Klasse while the bottom team in each pool gets  relegated to the Tweede Klasse.

Recent years
The Overgangsklasse champions for the recent years are shown below.

References

External links
 KNCB schedule and results for 2018 Overgangsklasse A season
 KNCB schedule and results for 2018 Overgangsklasse B season

Cricket in the Netherlands
Dutch domestic cricket competitions